Polonia may refer to:

 Poland, in Latin

Places
Polonia Maior or Greater Poland, a historical region of Poland
Polonia Minor or Lesser Poland, a historical region of Poland
 Polonia, Manitoba, Canada
 Polonia, Texas, United States
 Polonia, Wisconsin, United States
 Polonia Triangle, Chicago, United States
 Polonia Township, Roseau County, Minnesota, United States
 Polonia International Airport, Indonesia
 Medan Polonia, Medan, North Sumatra, Indonesia
 Camp Polonia, Ahvaz, Iran
 1112 Polonia, an asteroid
 Hotel Polonia Palace, historic four-star hotel in Warsaw on Jerusalem Avenue
 Hotel Polonia Palast, hotel in Łódź, Poland
 Ołdaki-Polonia, village in Ostrów Mazowiecka County, Masovian Voivodeship, Poland

Arts and entertainment
 Polònia, a comedy television programme shown in Catalonia, Spain
 Polonia (personification), the symbolic representation of Poland, including a list of art works titled Polonia
 Polonia (Elgar), a musical work by Edward Elgar
 Polonia (Wagner), an 1836 overture by Richard Wagner
 Polonia brothers, an American low-budget filmmaking duo
 Symphony in B minor (Paderewski), subtitled "Polonia", a 1908 symphony by Ignacy Jan Paderewski
 Polonia sive de situ, populis, moribus, magistratibus et Republica regni Polonici libri duo, book by Marcin Kromer, first published in Cologne in 1577 in Latin 
 Polonia-Express, East German film directed by Kurt Jung-Alsen
 Gaude Mater Polonia, medieval Polish hymns, written in Latin
 Stella Polonia, Polish folk song and dance ensemble associated with Our Lady Queen of Poland Parish in Toronto, Ontario, Canada
 The Spirit of Polonia, also known as Solidarity, by Edmund Lewandowski is a sculpture in Milwaukee, United States 
 TVP Polonia, a Polish cable and satellite channel of Telewizja Polska
 Polonia 1, Polish commercial television channels
 Radio Polonia International, international broadcasting station of Poland

People
 Louis Polonia (1935–2005), French footballer
 Luis Polonia (born 1963), Major League Baseball outfielder and designated hitter
 Mark Polonia and John Polonia (born 1968), twin brothers and filmmakers who founded Polonia brothers
 Polonia Ronzi (1835–1912), Italian operatic tenor, composer, conductor, and voice teacher
 Polonia Sanz y Ferrer (died 1892), Spanish dentist

Sport clubs
 FC Polonia Berlin, Germany
 Polonia Bydgoszcz
 Polonia Bytom
 Polonia Cernăuți, Romania
 Polonia Chodzież
 Polonia Gdańsk (disambiguation)
 Polonia Hamburg, Germany
 Polonia Karwina, Czechoslovakia
 Polonia Khmelnytsky, Ukraine 
 Polonia London, United Kingdom 
 Polonia Nowy Tomyśl
 Maribyrnong Polonia, now Western Eagles FC, Melbourne, Australia
 Polonia Piła
 Polonia Poznań
 Polonia Przemyśl
 Polonia Słubice
 Polonia Środa Wielkopolska
 Polonia Świdnica
 KS Polonia Vilnius, Lithuania 
 Polonia Warsaw

Other uses
 SS Polonia (1910), passenger steamship that was built in Scotland in 1910
 Polonia (train), a EuroCity express train between Austria and Warsaw
 Konwent Polonia, Polish student corporation
 Polish diaspora (Polonia in Polish)
 World Polonia Games, sports event, organized every two years for members of Polonia
 American Polonia
 The former name of the Broadway-Fillmore neighborhood in Buffalo, New York
 Polonia Technica, non-profit organization, established in 1941 in New York City
 Miss Polonia, national Beauty pageant in Poland 
 Order of Polonia Restituta, Polish state orde

See also
 
 
 Polonium
 Polonyna (disambiguation)
 Poloniny (disambiguation)